"La Libertad" (English: The Freedom) is a song by Spanish-German singer-songwriter Álvaro Soler. It was released on 10 May 2019, as the third single from his second studio album, Mar de Colores (2018), serving as the second single from its Versión Extendida reissue. The song was written by Soler, Ali Zuckowski, Jakke Erixson and Simon Triebel.

Music video
The music video for "La Libertad" was released on Álvaro Soler's YouTube channel on 10 May 2019. As of 18 July 2020, the video has over 34 million views.

Charts

Certifications

References

2019 singles
2019 songs
Spanish-language songs
Álvaro Soler songs
Songs written by Simon Triebel
Songs written by Álvaro Soler
Songs written by Jakke Erixson